This is a list of Ministers of Economy of Russia.

Russian SFSR

Head of State Committee of Economy

Minister of Economy

Minister of Economy and Finance

Russian Federation

Minister of Economy and Finance

Ministers of Economy

Ministers of Economic Development and Trade

Ministers of Economic Development

External links
Ministry Of Economic Development official website

Economy
Russia